WLXG (1300 AM) is a sports formatted broadcast radio station affiliated with ESPN Radio.  WLXG is licensed to Lexington, Kentucky, United States, and serves the Lexington and Frankfort area. It is owned and operated by L.M. Communications, Inc.   The station's studios are located at Triangle Center in downtown Lexington, and its transmitter is located in the northwest part of Lexington.

FM translator
WLXG programming is also relayed to an FM translator.  It is owned by L.M. Communications, Inc.

History
WLXG signed on as WKLX in 1946. It merged with WLEX (1340) by 1952, keeping the 1300 kHz frequency and getting the WLEX calls.  Much of the WKLX airstaff (like Claude Sullivan and Artie Kay) went to WVLK. James Narz, who later became famed game show host Tom Kennedy, worked at WKLX in 1948.

In 1958, WLEX was sold to Roy B. White and the call letters were changed to WBLG ("Bluegrass").

Until 1978, WBLG was 1,000 watts non-directional in the daytime, and 1,000 watts directional at night.  Daytime power was upped to 2,500 watts in 1978.

WBLG became the country-formatted WTKC in 1979.

In 1986, country music gave way to oldies and the calls were changed to WLXG.

In 1990, WLXG switched to a news/talk format. In the mid-2000s, WLXG picked up a sports talk format and became affiliated with ESPN Radio.

External links
ESPN SportsRadio 1300 online

LXG
Sports radio stations in the United States
Radio stations established in 1946
1946 establishments in Kentucky
ESPN Radio stations